Hollytree is an unincorporated community in Jackson County, Alabama, United States. Hollytree has a post office with ZIP code 35751.

References

Unincorporated communities in Jackson County, Alabama
Unincorporated communities in Alabama